Genea pavonacea is a species of bristle fly in the family Tachinidae. It is found in North America.

References

 O'Hara, James E., and D. Monty Wood (2004). "Catalogue of the Tachinidae (Diptera) of America North of Mexico". Memoirs on Entomology, International, vol. 18, 410.

Further reading

 Arnett, Ross H. (2000). American Insects: A Handbook of the Insects of America North of Mexico. CRC Press.

External links

 Diptera.info

Tachininae